The 1929 Wisconsin Badgers football team was an American football team that represented the University of Wisconsin in the 1929 Big Ten Conference football season. The team compiled a 4–5 record (1–4 against conference opponents), finished in last place in the Big Ten Conference, and outscored all opponents by a combined total of 88 to 78. Glenn Thistlethwaite was in his third year as Wisconsin's head coach.

Fullback Harold Rebholz was selected as the team's most valuable player. Guard John Parks was the team captain. Parks was also selected by the United Press as a first-team player on the 1929 All-Big Ten Conference football team.

The team played its home games at Camp Randall Stadium, which had a capacity of 38,293.  During the 1929 season, the average attendance at home games was 21,560.

Schedule

References

Wisconsin
Wisconsin Badgers football seasons
Wisconsin Badgers football